Ashiesh Roy (18 May 1965 – 24 November 2020) was an Indian television and film actor.

Filmography

Television

Movies

Dubbing career
Ashiesh Roy was also a voice actor who has been dubbing for foreign films.

Dubbing roles

Live action films

Animated films

Death 
Ashiesh Roy died on November 24, 2020, due to kidney failure.

References

External links
 
 

1965 births
2020 deaths
Indian male film actors
Indian male voice actors
Indian male television actors
Indian male comedians
21st-century Indian male actors